Capper is a surname. Notable people with the surname include:

Andy Capper (born 1973), English journalist
Arthur Capper (1865–1951), American politician
Charles Capper, American historian
Charles Capper (politician) (1822–1869), British Member of Parliament
Edmund Capper (1906–1998), English bishop
Freddy Capper (1891–1955), English footballer 
Gavin Capper, fictional character on the soap opera Shortland Street
Henry Capper (19th century), editor of London newspapers devoted to South Australia 
Jack Capper (1931–2009), Welsh footballer
James Capper, East India Company
John Capper (1861–1955), senior British Army officer
John Capper (editor) (1814–1898), English author and Orientalist
Louisa Capper, children's writer
Stewart Henbest Capper (1859–1925), Scottish architect
Thompson Capper (1863–1915), senior British Army officer
Warwick Capper (born 1963), Australian rules footballer
Wilfrid Merydith Capper (1905–1998), countryside campaigner in Northern Ireland
William Capper (1856–1934), senior British Army officer

Fictional characters 
Capper, a character in My Little Pony: The Movie (2017 film)

See also

Capper Pass and Son, British smelting and refining company
Capper–Volstead Act, American legislation
Murder of Suzanne Capper